"Grave" is the sixth-season finale of the television series Buffy the Vampire Slayer.  This episode is the second highest rated Buffy episode ever to air in the U.K. Sky One aired the episode, which reached 1.22 million viewers on its original airing.

This is the only Buffy season finale not written and directed by Joss Whedon.

Plot
Dark Willow tries to resist Giles' attack, rebuffing his attempts to help her. He is forced to bind her physically and magically. He informs Buffy and Anya that he has been endowed with magic from a powerful coven in England, which sent him to combat Willow. Privately, Buffy tells Giles about the difficulties she has endured the past year: she has been sleeping with Spike and working at the Doublemeat Palace to support Dawn amidst financial problems, and Xander left Anya at the altar leading to her becoming a vengeance demon again. Giles apologizes to Buffy for leaving her when she needed help, but she assures him he was right to do so: she had to face up to her responsibilities as an adult. She also confesses her insecurities to Giles on why she was resurrected. As they talk, Willow subordinates Anya telepathically, so that Anya breaks Giles's binding spells. She throws down Buffy and resumes her magical duel with Giles.

Xander and Dawn continue to protect Jonathan and Andrew; Xander becoming overwhelmed by guilt over his failure to act when Warren shot Buffy and murdered Tara. As Willow begins to overpower Giles, she also directs a magical attack at Xander, Dawn, and the others, forcing Buffy to leave to protect them. Willow then defeats Giles and drains his magical strength; the power breaks down her emotional shields. Overwhelmed by her pain and all the pain she senses, she announces she will end it by ending the world. Buffy manages to partially block Willow's attack, but she and Dawn are thrown underground while Xander is knocked unconscious. Andrew and Jonathan flee, planning an escape to Mexico.

At the Magic Box, Anya comes to and finds a critically wounded Giles on the ground. He can feel Dark Willow's presence and knows that she will end the world. Buffy tries to climb out of the hole by pulling coffins out of the surrounding dirt walls to stack and try to escape on. After Xander comes to, Buffy sends him to find some rope to help them get out. When Buffy and Dawn quarrel over Buffy's protective behavior, Anya briefly appears, telling them that Willow is raising a satanic temple named Proserpexa of dark magic from underground, and intends to use its artifacts to end the world by draining its life energies. Anya also relays Giles' message that Willow cannot be stopped by any magical or supernatural powers. Overhearing this, Xander leaves to confront Willow. Willow speaks to Buffy telepathically, telling her she deserves the right to die as a warrior, and raises earth-creatures to battle her and Dawn.

As Willow begins her final ritual of destruction, Xander confronts her and physically tries to stop her from completing it. She repels him with magic force, but, wounded, he renews his efforts. He reminds Willow of their friendship and that he loves her no matter what. He tells her that if she destroys the world, she kills him as well and that he will stay with her until she does. Willow's emotional barriers collapse, her dark powers drain away, and her physical transformation is undone. She collapses in tears. Giles revives and tells Anya that the magic Willow stole from him overpowered her emotional shields and gave Xander the chance to reach her. Anya is shocked to learn that Xander saved the world. Buffy and Dawn reconcile as they clamber out of the pit and Buffy vows to be a better sister to Dawn.

In Africa, a severely bruised and bloodied Spike successfully completes his trials and demands his promised reward, his greatest desire. Accordingly, his soul is returned to him.

References

External links

 

Buffy the Vampire Slayer (season 6) episodes
2002 American television episodes
Television episodes written by David Fury